KBS Classic FM (also known as KBS 1FM) is a South Korean radio network operated by the Korean Broadcasting System. Most of the schedule is assigned to classical music, making it one of the few radio networks in the world that broadcast mainly in its music format (notable ones include WFMT Radio Network in Chicago, United States BBC Radio 3 in London, United Kingdom).

Frequencies 
Seoul/Incheon/Gyeonggi 93.1 MHz
Chuncheon/Gapyeong/Gangwon 91.1 MHz
Busan/South Gyeongsang Province 92.7 MHz
Ulsan 101.9 MHz
Changwon/Masan/Jinhae 93.9 MHz
Jinju/Sacheon 89.3 MHz
Geochang 92.1 MHz
Daegu 89.7 MHz
Andong/Yeongju 88.1 MHz
Pohang/Gyeongju 93.5 MHz
Gwangju 92.3 MHz
Yosu/Suncheon 94.5 MHz
Mokpo 98.3 MHz
Jeonju/North Jeolla Province 100.7 MHz
Namwon 104.5 MHz
Daejeon/South Chungcheong Province 98.5 MHz
Cheongju/Okcheon 102.1 MHz
Cheongju/Cheongwon 94.1 MHz
Chungju/Eumseong 100.3 MHz
Gangneung/Sokcho 89.1 MHz
Taebaek 97.3 MHz
Wonju 89.5 MHz
Jeju/North Jeju 96.3 MHz
Seogwipo/South Jeju 99.9 MHz

See also 
 KBS Cool FM
 Gugak FM
 Gyeonggi Broadcasting Corporation

External links
 Kbs.co.kr
 Kbs.co.kr

1FM
Classical music radio stations
Radio stations in South Korea
Radio stations established in 1979